Göran Carl Oscar Lundqvist (born 4 August 1941) is a Swedish former diver. He competed at the 1960 Summer Olympics and the 1964 Summer Olympics.

References

External links
 
 

1941 births
Living people
Swedish male divers
Olympic divers of Sweden
Divers at the 1960 Summer Olympics
Divers at the 1964 Summer Olympics
Divers from Stockholm
20th-century Swedish people